is a fictional character in the Dragon Ball manga series created by Akira Toriyama. Within the series, he is the half-Saiyan half-Human son of Vegeta and Bulma and has at least two noteworthy incarnations. Trunks makes his debut appearance in chapter #331 "The Young Boy of Mystery", first published in Weekly Shōnen Jump magazine on July 2, 1991, as an unidentified young man who traveled back in time to warn series protagonist Goku and his allies of a deadly new enemy, the Androids of the Red Ribbon Army.

The present-timeline incarnation of Trunks is introduced as an infant during the story arc which features the first appearance of the Red Ribbon Androids. This version of Trunks makes recurring appearances as a major character in the Dragon Ball Z, Dragon Ball Super and various other media such as Dragon Ball GT and films produced by Toei Animation.

Voice actors 
In the original Japanese version of the entire Dragon Ball Z anime series and in all other media, Trunks is voiced by Takeshi Kusao. Akira Toriyama stated that it was difficult to decide on Present Trunks' voice. The producer at Toei Animation and the editorial department discussed that, perhaps, it would be better if they changed to a different voice actor for the child version. At that time, the serialization was still going on, and Toriyama did not know how the manga story would end; young Trunks might have ended up growing up and the story might have continued to the same time period when teenage Trunks returned to the future. In that case, if the voice actor would have been changed, it would have sounded strange. Eventually, Kusao ended up also voicing Trunks as a child and, after listening a few times, Toriyama felt that it was the right choice. However, the cries given by the character's infant form were provided by Hiromi Tsuru in an uncredited role.

In the English-language dub by Funimation, Eric Vale voices him both as a teen and as an adult in all Dragon Ball media, while Laura Bailey voices him as a child in the series, as well as the movie, Dragon Ball Z: Battle of Gods, as well as the other non-canon movies. Alexis Tipton voices him as a child starting from Dragon Ball Super.

Abilities 
Trunks possesses several abilities including superhuman strength, speed, reflexes, and energy blasts, which can be utilized by the use of ki. Both incarnations of Trunks have access to the Super Saiyan transformation, although their achievement of this form differs between incarnation. Future Trunks achieved this in his early teens, while present Trunks would be shown to have the ability at the age of eight.

Trunks is also known for his use of a longsword that he keeps in a scabbard mounted across his back. His main means of conveyance is a technique called  which gives him the ability of flight. However, Trunks does not rely on this technique as his only conveyance as he can also be seen piloting various crafts manufactured by his family's company, including the time machine which allowed him to visit Goku in the past. Unlike his present time counterpart, Future Trunks obtains two additional grades of Super Saiyan during his training with Vegeta in the Room of Spirit and Time. Unfortunately, these forms would greatly increase his ki consumption and greatly decrease his speed at the cost of additional strength, resulting in Future Trunks abandoning these grades after his initial fight with Cell. Upon his return to the past, Trunks is able to attain Super Saiyan 2 and can now also use his father's signature techniques, such as the Galick Gun and Final Flash. Later, when Black and Zamasu blame him for his constant time traveling, it fueles Trunks' rage and lets him transform into a new, previously unknown form named  and gives him enough power to fight both Black and Zamasu.

The present incarnation of Trunks is able to temporarily fuse with Goten to become the powerful being named  through a technique called Fusion, which was taught to them by Goku. They can also achieve Super Saiyan 3 with ease, a feat that was very difficult for Goku to achieve and maintain.

Appearances

Future Trunks 
Trunks first appears in chapter #331 , published in Weekly Shōnen Jump magazine on July 15, 1991. Here he is a mysterious seventeen year old capable of transforming into the Super Saiyan state, who appears and singlehandedly kills Frieza and his father, King Cold. Upon Goku's return from Planet Namek, Trunks confides in Goku his tragic story.

As told in the stand-alone manga side story  and chapters #419 and 420, Trunks has traveled from twenty years in the future where the world is in constant ruin due to the terror of the two androids #17 and #18 which were created by Doctor Gero, the former chief scientist of the Red Ribbon Army. By this time, Goku has succumbed to an unknown heart virus and everyone, with the exception of Gohan, has fallen at the hands of the artificial humans. Trunks has been living with Bulma and secretly training with Gohan. After an unsuccessful ambush, Gohan is murdered by the Androids. When Trunks finds the body, he becomes engulfed in rage and sadness, awakening his Super Saiyan transformation. After Gohan's death, Trunks assumes the mantle of Earth's sole protector against the artificial humans for the next three years until Bulma finishes her time machine. Once he informs Goku of the events to come, Trunks gives Goku a special medicine and returns to his own time.

Trunks returns to help in the present day battle against the artificial humans, only to learn that his actions only affected the present timeline with a new future while his own timeline remains unaffected. With the appearance of Cell from another alternate timeline, Trunks trains with Vegeta in the Room of Spirit and Time. After Vegeta's defeat, Trunks fights Cell in his newly gained Perfect form before conceding once learning his new Super Saiyan form proves to be ineffective. He later participates in Cell's martial arts tournament, where he is killed by Cell. After Trunks is revived by the Dragon Balls following Cell's defeat, he returns to his own timeline to defeat both the Androids and later the Cell of his time. A few years later, Trunks is accosted by the Supreme Kai of Universe 7, whom he helps in defeating Babidi and Dabura in order to prevent the revival of Majin Buu.

Years later, having reached Super Saiyan 2, Trunks encounters a new enemy known as Goku Black, who slaughters the Earth's residents as the Saiyan helps the survivors defend themselves, before attempting to recruit Goku and Vegeta from the present timeline. During Goku and Goku Black's fight, Trunks' time machine is destroyed, leaving him stuck in the present era, until Bulma rebuild a new one. After a reunion with a now adult Gohan, Trunks becomes encouraged to defeat Goku Black in order for the people of his own timeline to have a chance at that same happiness, also having a reunion with a reformed Android #18. Trunks then receives training from Vegeta, vowing to surpass both his father and Goku Black in strength. After Beerus erased Zamasu in the present timeline, Trunks would later learn that Goku Black is a rogue Kai named Zamasu from an unaltered present timeline who acquired Goku's body and allied himself with the future timeline's Zamasu. During the battle, both versions of Zamasu provoke Trunks into his Super Saiyan Rage form by telling him that his meddling in time is the cause of their actions. After numerous fights, including Goku Black and Zamasu fusing with the Potara earrings, Trunks gathers the energy from all remaining life on the planet into his sword and cuts Fusion Zamasu in half. Despite losing his body, Zamasu's essence began to envelop the entire universe, before being destroyed alongside the entire multiverse by that timeline's version of Zeno. Trunks and the others retreat to the past. Goku later invited Trunks to get Future Zeno. The two go back, with Trunks and Mai bidding their farewells as they live for a new future timeline where Zamasu's actions never occurred that is home to another Mai and Trunks.

Present Trunks 
Trunks' second incarnation first appears as an infant in chapter #337 , published on August 26, 1991. He is only featured as a background character. When he is eight, Trunks participates in the 25th  and defeats Son Goten in the junior division, although the two of them cheated equally. Goten is his best friend and childhood rival, though Trunks is stronger and older than Goten as it is later pointed out by Goku. Eager to compete in the adult division, Trunks and Goten together impersonate another competitor,  and are pitted against Android #18 and others in the Tenkaichi Budokai. But they are disqualified when #18 figured out who they are and blows their cover, revealing that they are really two people.

Upon the arrival of Majin Buu, Trunks is forced to train with Goten in the Room of Spirit and Time to become the fused warrior Gotenks. Gotenks fights Buu, first in the time dimension, then in the real world until the thirty-minute fusion time limit expires. Through Buu's treachery they, along with Piccolo, are absorbed by Buu, thus increasing his power. Once freed, Trunks, along with Goten, Gohan, and Piccolo are killed when Buu blows up the Earth. After being resurrected, Trunks helped to rally the people on Earth to support Goku's Genki-Dama in his defeat of Majin Buu. At the end of the series, Trunks, now grown up, participates in the 28th Tenkaichi Budokai against the fighter Otokosuki.

Trunks appears in Dragon Ball Super, which chronologically takes place before the ending of Dragon Ball Z, as a recurring support character. He is usually paired with Goten and often used as comic relief. He then meets his future counterpart in person for the first time during the Goku Black arc, having beforehand interacted with him as an infant. In the Universe Survival arc, Trunks and Goten are stopped from taking part in the Tournament of Power, and instead instructed to look after Android 17's haven for animals so that he can aid Goku in the tournament.

He, alongside Goten, both grown up, appear in Dragon Ball Super: Super Hero, assisting Gohan, Piccolo, and their friends in combating the revived Red Ribbon Army. Gotenks also appears, albeit is in the obese state due to the duo doing the fusion technique wrong.

Appearances in other media 
In Dragon Ball GT, Trunks' second incarnation has become the President of Capsule Corporation, but does not take the job seriously. He accompanies Goku and Pan into space to recover the Black Star Dragon Balls. They have many strange encounters and meet many unusual characters including the robot named Giru, who would act as the gang's Dragon Radar. Upon arriving on Giru's home world, the trio are hijacked by Dr. Myu's robots and Trunks is solidified in living metal for study. Although, the contents of the plate was not really Trunks, but a cleverly made decoy by both Trunks and Giru. Trunks uses the opportunity to uncover Dr. Myu's plan, which is to awaken Baby, and sabotage the process. Trunks' plan fails as Baby had managed to escape to Earth. When they return home, Baby has managed to possess Vegeta and brainwash everyone else into becoming his followers. Shortly after arriving, Trunks also falls victim to Baby's mind control and battles Goku. Later, he along with Goten travel the globe fighting the villains that escape from Hell.

Both incarnations of Trunks has appeared in most Dragon Ball related video games. He has also appeared in other related games such as Jump Super Stars, its sequel Jump Ultimate Stars, and Battle Stadium D.O.N. The game Dragon Ball Z: Shin Budokai – Another Road centers around Trunks' battle with Majin Boo in his future timeline. In 1992, Trunks would act as escort through time in the interactive Videkko game Dragon Ball Z: Get Together! Goku World. This version of Trunks plays a major role in the plot of Dragon Ball: Xenoverse, helping the player to correct changes in the Dragon Ball timeline caused by the manipulations of Towa and Mira and fights the player in the game's climax alongside the game's main antagonist Demigra after becoming possessed by him. After the duo are defeated and Trunks is returned to normal, he intervenes when Demigra tries to take control of the player.

In the Dragon Ball and One Piece crossover manga Cross Epoch, Trunks is a member of Captain Vegeta's air pirate crew. Trunks also made an appearance in the 2004 Fuji TV interactive feature Kyūtai Panic Adventure Returns!, where he and six other Dragon Ball characters delivered the Dragon Balls to restore the aqua city of Odaiba.

In music, the song "Chīsa na Senshi~Goten to Trunks no Theme~" by Shin Oya focuses on both Trunks and Goten.

Trunks has been featured in his own brand of soft drink called Trunks Cola.

Reception 
Trunks, especially the future incarnation, has been very positively received. While reviewing the TV special The History of Trunks, which was adapted from the stand-alone manga Trunks the Story: The Lone Warrior, Bobby Cooper of DVD Talk praised Trunks' background story, saying that it was a "good origin story that explains Trunks' motivation for becoming a fighter." Similarly, Chris Shepard of Anime News Network also enjoyed the background story and felt that Trunks was an understandable character who "I was really able to get into and sympathize for during his battles." In an IGN article on Dragon Ball GT, Trunks' character design in GT was criticized as being "goofy". Trunks' final fight against the villain Zamasu from Dragon Ball Super earned praise by Sam Leach from Anime News Network. However he also called it "cheesy" based on the way Trunks receives energy from all his allies in order to face his enemy. Shawn Saris from IGN shared similar comments, praising how he accidentally absorbs humanity's powers into his sword to defeat Zamasu while at the same time embracing his humanity.

Trunks is a popular character in the series; his future incarnation placed third in both the 1993 and 1995 Dragon Ball character popularity polls voted on by Weekly Shōnen Jump readers. In 2004, fans of the series voted him the fourth most popular character for a poll in the book Dragon Ball Forever. Trunks has appeared in various Anime Grand Prix polls, appearing fifth in the category "best male character" in the 1992 poll and fifth again in the 1993 poll and nineteenth in the 1994 poll. Jian DeLeon of Complex magazine named him thirteenth on a list of the 25 Most Stylish Anime Characters.

Trunks' Japanese voice actor, Takeshi Kusao, has cited Trunks as his favorite Dragon Ball character. He further stated in an interview that he was elated when he was cast to voice him. Kusao noted that Trunks' first appearance had an incredible impact and left a great impression on him, referring to his fight with Frieza in which he easily defeated the strongest being in the universe. Similarly, Funimation voice actor Christopher Sabat stated that apart from Vegeta, Trunks is his favorite character from the series. He liked how his character is the "lone survivor of the apocalypse, son of the most angry and the most headstrong characters." He additionally liked Trunks' fights such as the one in which he easily killed Frieza.

In an interview, actor Masi Oka compared his Heroes character Hiro Nakamura to Trunks, as both are time travellers who carry swords. Manga creator Tite Kubo stated that to this day no fight scene has shocked him more than Trunks' first appearance.

References 

Dragon Ball characters
Anime and manga characters who can move at superhuman speeds
Anime and manga characters with superhuman strength
Child characters in anime and manga
Comics characters introduced in 1991
Fictional businesspeople
Fictional characters with energy-manipulation abilities
Fictional characters with extrasensory perception
Fictional characters with post-traumatic stress disorder
Fictional characters with slowed ageing
Fictional characters with superhuman durability or invulnerability
Fictional extraterrestrial–human hybrids in comics
Fictional male martial artists
Fictional murdered people
Fictional regicides
Fictional socialites
Fictional sole survivors
Fictional space pilots
Fictional swordfighters in anime and manga
Fighting game characters
Male characters in anime and manga
Martial artist characters in anime and manga
Teenage characters in anime and manga
Time travelers
Vigilante characters in comics

ca:Llista de personatges de Bola de Drac#T
pl:Lista postaci występujących w Dragon Ball#Trunks